Young-Noyes House, also known as the University of Charleston President's House, is a historic home located at Charleston, West Virginia.  It was built in 1922 and is a white-painted 15-room brick house, featuring a central two-story gabled block and a shallow two-story gabled ell. It has a river-facing flat-roofed tetrastyle portico; the two-story smooth shaft columns are of the Doric order.  The home is in the Colonial Revival style.  It was purchased in 1951 to serve as the Morris Harvey College President's home.

It was listed on the National Register of Historic Places in 1978.

References

Houses in Charleston, West Virginia
Colonial Revival architecture in West Virginia
Houses completed in 1922
Houses on the National Register of Historic Places in West Virginia
National Register of Historic Places in Charleston, West Virginia
University of Charleston
Official residences in the United States